Foyer des Arts were a German experimental pop duo founded in 1981 consisting of Max Goldt (vocals, lyrics) and Gerd Pasemann (instruments). They released four original albums between 1981 and 1995, but were on hiatus for most of that time. Today, they are primarily remembered for their minor hit "Wissenswertes über Erlangen" (1982) as well as being the springboard for the career of Max Goldt, who emerged as a successful humorous writer in the 1990s.

Band history 
Goldt and Pasemann met in West Berlin in 1978 and formed the core of the band Favorit, which soon renamed itself to Aroma Plus. Influenced by new wave and art rock, they played several gigs on the West Berlin club circuit with changing line-ups and self-released one EP and a single. In 1981, Goldt and Pasemann decided to continue working strictly as a duo under the name Foyer des Arts, an allusion to an art school in Haiti ("Foyer des Arts Plastiques"). They recorded and self-released the album Die seltsame Sekretärin ("The Strange Secretary"). A single off this album, "Eine Königin mit Rädern untendran" ("A Queen with Wheels Attached to Her Underside"), became a minor hit on the Berlin club scene. At that time, the New German Wave, originally an underground phenomenon influenced by international new wave music, was entering the mainstream and major labels were eager to recruit any new talents that could be marketed as New German Wave. This led to Foyer des Arts being signed by Warner Music's German branch, WEA Records, even though they never saw themselves as part of this trend.

Foyer des Arts' first album for WEA was titled Von Bullerbü nach Babylon (1982). The title, containing a reference to Astrid Lindgren's fictional village, would translate as "From Bullerby to Babylon" or (for American ears) "From Noisy Village to Babylon". It credited Pasemann for "guitars, bass, arrangements", Goldt for "vocals, percussion, prepared acoustic guitar and prepared zither". The first single from the album was "Wissenswertes über Erlangen" ("Things Worth Knowing About Erlangen"). Its lyrics humorously reflected Goldt's experience from working as a tourist guide, recounting the clichés spouted by guides and tourists, with a simple, nursery rhyme-like melody. "Wissenswertes" spent seven weeks on the official German singles chart, peaking at #36 in October 1982. The single misguided the mainstream audience into thinking that Foyer des Arts was a comedy act or at least represented the lighter side of German new wave, when in fact much of the album was improvised, experimental and darkish. At the same time, the target group that might actually have appreciated these virtues dismissed them due to the jovial image created by "Wissenswertes". Sales of Foyer's first album for WEA failed to meet the label's expectations and was deleted from the catalog within months of its release. WEA refused to publish any further recordings, but neither did they agree to cancel the contract, so the band was effectively on ice. In 1984, Goldt published his first solo album. 

It was not until after the WEA deal had expired in 1986 that Foyer des Arts finally released their second album, Die Unfähigkeit zu frühstücken ("The Inability to Eat Breakfast"] on the independent label Fünfundvierzig. This established them as a respected part of the German independent music scene; as such, John Peel invited them to his BBC Peel Sessions. It was followed by Ein Kuss in der Irrtumstaverne (roughly: "A Kiss in the Tavern of Illusion") in 1988. The double live album Was ist super? ("What Is Super?") (1989) marked the end of Foyer's second active phase. By that time, Goldt had begun writing a column for the satirical magazine Titanic which would eventually make him a popular author. In 1995, on Pasemann's request, the band briefly reunited to record a one-off "farewell album" entitled Die Menschen ("The Humans").

In 2000, a best-of collection entitled Könnten Bienen fliegen ("If Bees Could Fly") was issued on the Fünfundvierzig label; in 2003, Warner Music Germany finally re-released Von Bullerbü nach Babylon, which had been out of print for almost two decades, as a special edition compact disc. Both the track list and cover artwork were changed to bring them closer to the band's original intentions which they felt had been compromised due to WEA's interventions.

Discography

Albums 
 1981: Die seltsame Sekretärin
 1982: Von Bullerbü nach Babylon
 1986: Die Unfähigkeit zu frühstücken
 1988: Ein Kuß in der Irrtumstaverne
 1989: Was ist super?
 1995: Die Menschen
 2000: Könnten Bienen fliegen – Das Beste von Foyer des Arts
 2022: Die John-Peel-Session (EP)

Singles 
 1981: "Eine Königin mit Rädern untendran"
 1982: "Wissenswertes über Erlangen"
 1982: "Trends"
 1984: "Ein Haus aus den Knochen von Cary Grant"
 1985: "Schimmliges Brot"
 1986: "Gleichzeitig? Das kann ich nicht"
 1988: "Penis → Vagina"

External links
(all links in German)
Foyer des Arts interviewing themselves
Foyer des Arts on www.ichwillspass.de

German new wave musical groups
Musical groups established in 1978